North Carolina Highway 581 (NC 581) is a primary state highway in the U.S. state of North Carolina. The highway travels from Goldsboro to Louisburg, connecting various rural communities in between.

Route description

Dedicated and memorial names

NC 581 feature two dedicated stretches of highway:
 George Washington Finch Bridge – Official name of the NC 581 overpass of US 264 in Nash County (approved: September 8, 1978).
 Clifton L Benson Highway – Official name of NC 56/NC 581 from Mapleville to Louisburg (approved: December 7, 1972).

History
Established in 1933 as a new primary routing, NC 581 originally traversed from US 264/NC 91 in Bailey, north to US 64/NC 90 in Spring Hope. In 1937, NC 581 was extended south on new primary routing to US 301 near Lucama. By 1941, NC 581 was also extended north on new primary routing to NC 56 in Mapleville.

By 1950, NC 581 extended again on new primary routing south to US 70, then east replacing NC 111, ending at US 70 Business and US 117 Business in downtown Goldsboro. In 1982, NC 581 was extended north from Mapleville, concurrency overlapped with NC 56, to its current northern terminus in Louisburg.

In 1998, NC 581 was removed from downtown Goldsboro and redirected south along US 13/US 117, from Ash Street to Arrington Bridge Road, then southeast to its current southern terminus with NC 111. In 2008, NC 581 was realigned onto new freeway extension with US 117, removing it from part of Ash Street and overlap with US 13/US 117 Alternate; a year later US 117 would revert to its former route, leaving NC 581 on the new freeway segment.

In 2015, NC 581 was rerouted in Bailey, following along the truck route along Main, Benson and Deans Streets; the one block of Sanford Street became SR 1186 and is restricted to all thru trucks with a load limit exceeding . The justification for the route change was because of the railroad underpass with a  vertical clearance. Nine crashes, including a school activity bus, happened between May 1, 2008 and April 30, 2013; also, representatives from Carolina and Northwestern Railroad indicated that they would not allow a widening of the underpass.

Junction list

Special routes

Goldsboro connector

Identified only on official state maps, the route is only marked as either "TO I-795" or "TO US 117."

Bailey truck route

The route avoids a low railroad overpass bridge on NC 581; travelers who took the route would traverse along Main, Benson and Deans Street (US 264 Alt.) in Bailey. On August 12, 2015, the truck route was eliminated in favor of rerouting NC 581 along said route.

References

External links

NCRoads.com: N.C. 581

581
Transportation in Wayne County, North Carolina
Transportation in Wilson County, North Carolina
Transportation in Nash County, North Carolina
Transportation in Franklin County, North Carolina